Sarath may refer to:

People
R. Sarath, Indian film director and Screewriter.
Sarath (composer) or Sharreth (born 1969), Indian film composer
Sarath Babu (born 1951), Indian film actor
Sarath Das (born 1978), Indian film actor
Sarath Fonseka (born 1950), Sri Lankan military leader
R. Sarathkumar (born 1954), Indian film actor, journalist and politician
Sarath Ranawaka (1951–2009), Member of the Parliament of Sri Lanka
Sarath N. Silva, former Chief Justice of the Supreme Court of Sri Lanka
Sarath Kumara Gunaratna, Sri Lankan politician and former minister
Sarath Weerasekara (born 1951), Sri Lankan politician, admiral and former deputy minister
Sarath Amunugama, Sri Lankan academic
Sarath Amunugama (politician) (born 1939), Sri Lankan civil servant, politician, and minister

Places
 Sarath, Deoghar, a community development block in Jharkhand, India
 Sarath, Deoghar (village), a village in Jharkhand, India
 Sarath (Vidhan Sabha constituency)